Nikolay Valev (born 24 April 1980 in Yambol) is a Bulgarian football forward who currently plays for Tundzha Yambol.

References

External links 
 

1980 births
Living people
Bulgarian footballers
First Professional Football League (Bulgaria) players
PFC Spartak Varna players
PFC Cherno More Varna players
PFC Slavia Sofia players
PFC Svetkavitsa players
PFC Dobrudzha Dobrich players
People from Yambol
Association football forwards
Bulgarian expatriate sportspeople in Azerbaijan